Westward Bound is a 1930 American pre-Code western film directed by Harry S. Webb and starring Jay Wilsey, Allene Ray and Buddy Roosevelt.

Cast
 Jay Wilsey as Bob Lansing 
 Allene Ray as 	Marge Holt
 Buddy Roosevelt as 	Frank - Ranch Foreman
 Fern Emmett as 	Emma
 Ben Corbett as 	Ben
 Yakima Canutt as 	Jim - Gang Leader
 Tom London as 	Dick - Rustler
 Robert Walker as 	Steve - Henchman
 Pete Morrison as 	Rustler
 Frank Ellis as 	Car Thief 
 Bob Roper as 	Henchman 
 Henry Roquemore as Tony - Bartender

References

Bibliography
 Munden, Kenneth White. The American Film Institute Catalog of Motion Pictures Produced in the United States, Part 1. University of California Press, 1997.
 Pitts, Michael R. Poverty Row Studios, 1929–1940. McFarland & Company, 2005.

External links
 

1930 films
1930 Western (genre) films
1930s English-language films
American Western (genre) films
Films directed by Harry S. Webb
American black-and-white films
1930s American films